Senator Wood may refer to:

Amos E. Wood (1810–1850), Ohio State Senate
Asa Wood (1865–1945), Nebraska State Senate
Benjamin Wood (American politician) (1820–1900), New York State Senate
Daniel P. Wood (1819–1891), New York State Senate
Frank Wood (Iowa politician) (born 1951), Iowa State Senate
George Tyler Wood (1795–1858), Texas State Senate
Jack Arthur Wood Jr. (1923–2005), Idaho State Senate
James Wood (New York politician) (1820–1892), New York State Senate
Jeannette Wood (born 1932), Washington State Senate
John Wood (governor) (1798–1880), Illinois State Senate
Lloyd H. Wood (1896–1964), Pennsylvania State Senate
Reuben Wood (1793–1864), Ohio State Senate
Samuel Newitt Wood (1825–1891), Kansas State Senate
Stephen Mosher Wood (1832–1920), Ohio State Senate
T. Newell Wood (1909–1982), Pennsylvania State Senate
Thomas Jefferson Wood (1844–1908), Indiana State Senate
William R. Wood (Indiana politician) (1861–1933), Indiana State Senate